Kamal Mustafa Abdullah Sultan al-Tikriti (born 1955) was the Secretary General of the Republican Guard under the rule of Saddam Hussein.  He was taken into custody on 17 May 2003. 

He was the Queen of Clubs in the deck of most-wanted Iraqi playing cards.

On 6 June 2011, Abdullah was sentenced to death for his role in the violent repression of a Shiite uprising in 1991.

References

1955 births
Living people
Military leaders of the Iraq War
Arab Socialist Ba'ath Party – Iraq Region politicians
Iraqi prisoners sentenced to death
Most-wanted Iraqi playing cards
Iraq War prisoners of war
Iraqi prisoners of war